Chemsakiella is a genus of beetles in the family Cerambycidae, containing the following species:

 Chemsakiella michelbacheri (Chemsak, 1984)
 Chemsakiella ricei (Chemsak, 1984)
 Chemsakiella virens (Bates, 1885)
 Chemsakiella virgulata (Chemsak, 1987)

References

Trachyderini
Cerambycidae genera